This is a selection of films and television appearances by British-American comedian and actor Bob Hope (1903-2003). Hope, a former boxer, began his acting career in 1925 in various vaudeville acts and stage performances  
 
Hope's feature film debut would come in The Big Broadcast of 1938.(although he made his debut in film short Going Spanish). Hope would continue to act, in addition to stand-up comedy USO performances for American military personnel that where stationed overseas, his final starring feature theatrical release was the comedy Cancel My Reservation in 1972, (although he would feature in the 1986 made for TV film A Masterpiece of Murder).  He would retire in 1997.

Filmography

Film Shorts
 Going Spanish (1934) (short film) as Bob
 Paree, Paree (1934) (short film) as Peter

Theatrical features
 The Big Broadcast of 1938 (1938) (with W. C. Fields and Martha Raye) as Buzz Fielding
 College Swing (1938) (with George Burns, Gracie Allen, Martha Raye, and Betty Grable) as Bud Brady
 Give Me a Sailor (1938) (with Martha Raye, Betty Grable, and Jack Whiting) as Jim Brewster
 Thanks for the Memory (1938) (with Shirley Ross) as Steve Merrick
 Never Say Die (1939) (with Martha Raye and Andy Devine) as John Kidley
 Some Like It Hot (1939; AKA Rhythm Romance) (with Shirley Ross and Gene Krupa) as Nicky Nelson
 The Cat and the Canary (1939) (with Paulette Goddard) as Wally Campbell
 Road to Singapore (1940) (with Bing Crosby and Dorothy Lamour) as Ace Lannigan
 The Ghost Breakers (1940) (with Paulette Goddard) as Larry Lawrence
 Road to Zanzibar (1941) (with Bing Crosby and Dorothy Lamour) as Fearless
 Caught in the Draft (1941) (with Eddie Bracken) as Don Bolton
 Nothing But the Truth (1941) (with Paulette Goddard) as Steve Bennett
 Louisiana Purchase (1941) (with Vera Zorina and Victor Moore) as Jim Taylor
 Star Spangled Rhythm (1942) (with Bing Crosby and Paramount Pictures all-star cast) as Bob Hope - Master of Ceremonies
 My Favorite Blonde (1942) (with Madeleine Carroll) as Larry Haines
 Road to Morocco (1942) (with Bing Crosby and Dorothy Lamour) as Orville 'Turkey' Jackson / Aunt Lucy
 Combat America (1943) (short documentary film)
 They Got Me Covered (1943) (with Dorothy Lamour) as Robert Kittredge
 Show Business at War (1943) (short documentary film)
 Let's Face It (1943) (with Betty Hutton) as Jerry Walker
 The Princess and the Pirate (1944) (with Virginia Mayo and Walter Brennan) as Sylvester the Great
 The Story of G.I. Joe (1945) (voice on radio program; uncredited)
 Road to Utopia (1946) (with Bing Crosby and Dorothy Lamour) as Chester Hooton
 Monsieur Beaucaire (1946) (with Joan Caulfield) as Monsieur Beaucaire
 My Favorite Brunette (1947) (with Dorothy Lamour, Lon Chaney, Jr. and Peter Lorre) as Ronnie Jackson
 Variety Girl (1947) (with Bing Crosby and Paramount Pictures all-star cast) as Bob Hope
 Where There's Life (1947) (with William Bendix) as Michael Joseph Valentine
 Road to Rio (1947) (with Bing Crosby and Dorothy Lamour) as Hot Lips Barton
 The Paleface (1948) (with Jane Russell) as 'Painless' Peter Potter
 Sorrowful Jones (1949) (with Lucille Ball) as Humphrey 'Sorrowful' Jones
 The Great Lover (1949) (with Rhonda Fleming) as Freddie Hunter
 Fancy Pants (1950) (with Lucille Ball) as Humphrey
 The Lemon Drop Kid (1951) (with Marilyn Maxwell) as Sidney Milburn aka The Lemon Drop Kid
 My Favorite Spy (1951) (with Hedy Lamarr) as Peanuts White / Eric Augustine
 The Greatest Show on Earth (1952) as Spectator (cameo, uncredited)
 Son of Paleface (1952) (with Jane Russell and Roy Rogers) as Peter Potter Jr.
 Road to Bali (1952) (with Bing Crosby and Dorothy Lamour) as Harold Gridley
 Off Limits (1953) (with Mickey Rooney and Marilyn Maxwell) as Wally Hogan
 Scared Stiff (1953) as Skeleton (cameo, uncredited)
 Here Come the Girls (1953) (with Arlene Dahl and Rosemary Clooney) as Stanley Snodgrass
 Casanova's Big Night (1954) (with Joan Fontaine and Basil Rathbone) as Pippo Popolino
 The Seven Little Foys (1955) (with James Cagney as George M. Cohan) as Eddie Foy
 That Certain Feeling (1956) (with Eva Marie Saint and George Sanders) as Francis X. Dignan
 The Iron Petticoat (1956) (with Katharine Hepburn) as Major Charles "Chuck" Lockwood
 Beau James (1957) (with Vera Miles and Alexis Smith) as Mayor James J. 'Jimmy' Walker
 Paris Holiday (1958) (with Fernandel, Anita Ekberg, Martha Hyer, and Preston Sturges) as Robert Leslie Hunter
 The Geisha Boy (1958) (cameo; appears on TV) as himself (on TV) (uncredited)
 Alias Jesse James (1959) (with Rhonda Fleming and many cameos) as Milford Farnsworth
 The Five Pennies (1959) as himself - Leaving Brown Derby Restaurant (uncredited) (cameo)
 The Facts of Life (1960) (with Lucille Ball) as Larry Gilbert
 Bachelor in Paradise (1961) (with Lana Turner) as  Adam J. Niles
 The Road to Hong Kong (1962) (with Bing Crosby and Joan Collins) as Chester Babcock
 Critic's Choice (1963) (with Lucille Ball and Rip Torn) as Parker Ballantine
 Call Me Bwana (1963) (with Anita Ekberg) as Matt
 A Global Affair (1964) (with Michèle Mercier and Yvonne De Carlo) as Frank Larrimore
 I'll Take Sweden (1965) (with Tuesday Weld) as Bob Holcomb
 The Oscar (1966) as himself (cameo, uncredited)
 Boy, Did I Get a Wrong Number! (1966) (with Elke Sommer) as Thomas J. 'Tom' Meade
 Not with My Wife, You Don't! (1966) as himself - USO Christmas Show (cameo, uncredited)
 Eight on the Lam (1967) (with Phyllis Diller and Jonathan Winters) as Henry Dimsdale
 The Private Navy of Sgt. O'Farrell (1968) (with Phyllis Diller) as Sgt. Dan O'Farrell
 How to Commit Marriage (1969) (with Jackie Gleason) as Frank Benson
 Cancel My Reservation (1972) (with Eva Marie Saint and Ralph Bellamy) as Dan Bartlett
 The Muppet Movie (1979) as Ice Cream Vendor (cameo)
 Spies Like Us (1985) as himself (cameo)
 A Masterpiece of Murder (1986) (with Don Ameche (TV)) as Dan Dolan

Voice roles and documentaries
 The Simpsons (1992) (TV; "Lisa the Beauty Queen") – Himself;  voice
 A Century of Cinema (1994) (Documentary)
 That Little Monster (1994) as himself (voice)
 Off the Menu: The Last Days of Chasen's (1997) (Documentary)

Box office ranking

For a number of years Hope was ranked as one of the most popular stars in the world:
1941 – 4th (US)
1942 – 5th (US)
1943 – 2nd (US)
1944 – 3rd (US)
1945 – 7th (US)
1946 – 5th (US)
1947 – 6th (US)
1948 – 5th (US)
1949 – 1st (US)
1950 – 2nd (US), 1st (UK)
1951 – 6th (US), 1st (UK)
1952 – 5th (US), 1st (UK)
1953 – 8th (US)

Portrayals 
Hope was portrayed by Greg Kinnear in the 2020 comedy-drama film Misbehaviour about the Miss World 1970 Women's Liberation protests.

References 

Male actor filmographies
British filmographies
American filmographies
filmography